"I'll Be Waiting" is a rock song written by Lenny Kravitz and Craig Ross for Kravitz's eighth studio album, It Is Time for a Love Revolution (2008). It was released as the album's lead single on December 6, 2007 (although "Bring It On" had been previously released as a radio-only single to U.S. rock stations). The iTunes download release date for the song was November 6, 2007.

The song is a power ballad, where Kravitz sings of waiting for someone, heartbroken over a failed relationship, to realize he is the one who really loves her.

Chart performance
"I'll Be Waiting" has been highly successful across Europe; it topped the charts in the Czech Republic and reached the top five in Italy, the Netherlands, Belgium, and Switzerland and the top ten in Germany, Austria, and Slovakia, peaking at number 13 on a composite European Hot 100 Singles. In Germany, it was his first top-ten single and his best-selling single, reaching number six. It saw mild success in North America, where it peaked at number 73 on the U.S. Billboard Hot 100 and number 45 on the Canadian Hot 100. The single has not charted in Oceania.

Music video
The original video for "I'll Be Waiting" was shot in Central Park in New York City with Marc Webb directing but that video was later shelved and a new version, which Kravitz co-directed with Philip Andelman, was filmed in Kravitz's New York City recording studio. The video which premiered on VH1's Top 20 Countdown at number three is shot entirely in black and white. It features Kravitz in the studio recording the song. He is shown playing the piano, the drums, the guitar, and the bass, and simply singing the song throughout the video. He is also shown towards the end directing the orchestra on the track.

In popular culture
Kravitz performed the song at the American Music Awards of 2007 and on the 2008 Dick Clark's New Year's Rockin' Eve. This song is also featured in the ending credits of the film L: Change the World.

Charts

Weekly charts

Year-end charts

Certifications

References

2000s ballads
2007 singles
2007 songs
Lenny Kravitz songs
Music videos directed by Philip Andelman
Number-one singles in the Czech Republic
Rock ballads
Song recordings produced by Lenny Kravitz
Songs written by Craig Ross
Songs written by Lenny Kravitz
Virgin Records singles